Mihajlo Stanković (born 5 June 1993) is a Serbian volleyball player, a member of Serbia men's national volleyball team and Turkish club Develi Belediyespor  U19 European Champion 2011, U19 World Champion 2011.

Career

Club
In 2015 went to Polish club - PGE Skra Bełchatów. On February 7, 2016 he played with PGE Skra and won the 2016 Polish Cup after beating ZAKSA in the final. In April 2016 he was a member of the same team which won a bronze medal in the 2015–16 PlusLiga championship.

Sporting achievements

Clubs

CEV Challenge Cup
  2014/2015 - with OK Vojvodina Novi Sad

National championships
 2009/2010  Serbian Cup, with OK Vojvodina Novi Sad
 2010/2011  Serbian Championship, with OK Vojvodina Novi Sad
 2011/2012  Serbian Cup, with OK Vojvodina Novi Sad
 2011/2012  Serbian Championship, with OK Vojvodina Novi Sad
 2013/2014  Serbian Championship, with OK Vojvodina Novi Sad
 2014/2015  Serbian Cup, with OK Vojvodina Novi Sad
 2015/2016  Polish Cup, with PGE Skra Bełchatów
 2015/2016  Polish Championship, with PGE Skra Bełchatów
 2016/2017  Polish Championship, with PGE Skra Bełchatów

National team
 2011  CEV U19 European Championship
 2011  FIVB U19 World Championship

References

1993 births
Living people
Sportspeople from Novi Sad
Serbian men's volleyball players
Serbian expatriate sportspeople in Poland
Expatriate volleyball players in Poland
Serbian expatriate sportspeople in Turkey
Expatriate volleyball players in Turkey
Skra Bełchatów players